Scaevola anchusifolia commonly known as silky scaevola, is a species of flowering plant in the family Goodeniaceae. It is a small, upright or decumbent shrub with fan-shaped  blue to bluish white flowers and is endemic to Western Australia.

Description
Flowering occurs from July to November and the fruit is a rounded, flattened shape, wrinkled, smooth and with two sterile cavities.

Taxonomy
Scaevola anchusifolia was first formally described in 1837 by George Bentham and the description was published in Enumeratio plantarum quas in Novae Hollandiae ora austro-occidentali ad fluvium Cygnorum et in Sinu Regis Georgii collegit Carolus liber baro de Hügel.

Distribution and habitat
Silky scaevola grows from the Murchison River to Yalgorup National Park on coastal plains, limestone ridges and sand dunes.

References

 

anchusifolia
Flora of Western Australia
Plants described in 1837
Taxa named by George Bentham